Pyropteron mannii is a moth of the family Sesiidae. It is found in north-western Turkey and the coast of Bulgaria nearest the Black Sea.

The larvae feed on Geranium rotundifolium.

References

Moths described in 1853
Sesiidae
Moths of Europe
Moths of Asia